Apostolos Tsianakas (born 11 July 1979) is a Greek football player who currently plays for Oikonomos Tsaritsani in the Greek Football League 2.

Career
Born in Larissa, Tsianakas played for Larissa F.C. and Fostiras F.C. in the Greek Beta Ethniki and was on the books of Akratitos F.C. during the 2001–02 season.

References

External links
Profile at Onsports.gr

1979 births
Living people
Footballers from Larissa
Greek footballers
Association football defenders
Aiolikos F.C. players
A.P.O. Akratitos Ano Liosia players
Athlitiki Enosi Larissa F.C. players
Trikala F.C. players
Ethnikos Asteras F.C. players
Anthoupoli Larissa F.C. players